Seven Achaemenid clans or seven Achaemenid houses were seven significant families that had key roles during the Achaemenid era. Only one of them had regnant pedigree.

Nobles of the seven clans 
According to Herodotus, after the departure of Cambyses II for Egypt, the usurper Gaumata impersonated Bardiya (Smerdis), the younger brother of Cambyses, and became king. A group of seven Persian noblemen became suspicious of the false king and conspired to overthrow Gaumata. After the death of Gaumata, in a negotiation to determine the form of government, Otanes (Hutan) recommended a democratic government but his offer was not adopted and monarchy continued in Iran.

The names of them were mentioned in Herodotus' Histories and the Behistun Inscription:
 Otanes
 Ardumanish (possibly the same as Aspathines)
 Gobryas, father of Mardonius
 Intaphrenes
 Megabyzus I
 Hydarnes
 Darius I

Arthur Emanuel Christensen the Danish historian and Iranologist, Herodotus was mistaken to say their main prominence was participation of them in murder of Gaumata. Also, the Parthians continued those formations.

See also
 Seven Parthian clans

Notes

References 
 Sassanid Persia by Arthur Emanuel Christensen 

People from the Achaemenid Empire
Clans